A Very Fine Love is the fifteenth studio album recorded by singer Dusty Springfield, and thirteenth released. Recorded in 1994 with producer Tom Shapiro and released in 1995, it was a Columbia Records release in both the US and UK, and Springfield's first such simultaneous release since Living Without Your Love in 1979.

Background
The album was originally tentatively called Dusty in Nashville, to tie in with the 25th anniversary of Dusty Springfield's keynote work Dusty in Memphis, but her record company "decided against it, in the belief that it would lead audiences to mistakenly expect a country album. A Very Fine Love was to be promoted by the TV documentary Full Circle, a 90-minute career retrospective featuring British comedians Jennifer Saunders and Dawn French interviewing Springfield in their inimitably irreverent way – Springfield herself was a big fan of French & Saunders' and their goonish sense of humor – as well as interviews with friends, fans and colleagues such as the Pet Shop Boys' Neil Tennant, Dionne Warwick, Burt Bacharach, Elvis Costello and Martha Reeves, and footage from the recording of the upcoming Nashville album.

During the three months of recording of the album, Springfield often had bouts of laryngitis and other undiagnosed health issues. Upon returning to England, she saw a specialist and was subsequently diagnosed with breast cancer. Upon learning Springfield was to undergo radiotherapy, her manager, Vicki Wickham, was able to convince Columbia Records to delay releasing A Very Fine Love until Springfield was well enough to do promotion work.

Springfield's cancer went into remission, and in June 1995, A Very Fine Love was released. It made little impact on the US album charts, but did reach No. 43 on the British charts. The title that got the best critical reception was the blues-tinged closing track "Where Is a Woman to Go?", written by Jerry Gillespie and K. T. Oslin and originally recorded by Dottie West in 1984, featuring guest vocals by Oslin (who had recorded the song herself in 1988) and Mary Chapin Carpenter. When promoting the album in the UK on TV-show Later With Jools Holland, Springfield performed the track live, backed by Sinéad O'Connor and Alison Moyet. One track from the album, "Wherever Would I Be", a Diane Warren-penned duet with Daryl Hall was featured in the movie While You Were Sleeping, and was a minor chart hit in Britain, along with Will Jennings' gospel-flavoured "Roll Away", the last charting single of her lifetime. The album also included the Warren-penned song "Lovin' Proof", originally recorded by Celine Dion for her The Colour of My Love album two years previously.

Due to modest sales of the album, Columbia Records didn't pick up an option for renewing Springfield's contract. Springfield's cancer recurred in late 1996, and she died in 1999; A Very Fine Love represents the final studio album released during Springfield's lifetime.

Release 
A 2-disc expanded collector's edition of A Very Fine Love was released by Cherry Red Records in October 2016. The first disc features the entire album, two bonus tracks from the "Wherever Would I Be" single, and disc 2 contains promotional videos for "Roll Away" and "Wherever Would I Be", respectively.

Track listing
"Roll Away" (Will Jennings, Martee Lebow) – 4:12
"Very Fine Love" a.k.a. "Fine, Fine, Very Fine Love" (Bob DiPiero, Jim Photoglo) – 4:09
"Wherever Would I Be" (Duet with Daryl Hall) (Diane Warren) – 3:58
"Go Easy on Me" (Randy Goodrum, John Jarvis) – 5:36
"You Are the Storm" (Matraca Berg, Ronnie Samoset) – 4:16
"I Can't Help the Way I Don't Feel" (Tom Shapiro, Chris Waters, Michael Garvin) – 3:41
"All I Have to Offer You Is Love" (Craig Wiseman) – 3:47
"Lovin' Proof" (Diane Warren) – 3:40
"Old Habits Die Hard" (Terry Britten, Graham Lyle) – 3:36
"Where Is a Woman to Go?" (Jerry Gillespie, K.T. Oslin) – 4:08

Personnel
Dusty Springfield – lead vocals
Daryl Hall – vocals ("Wherever Would I Be?")
Mary Chapin Carpenter – vocals ("Where Is a Woman to Go?")
K.T. Oslin – vocals ("Where Is a Woman to Go?")
Kristina Clark – backing vocals
Kim Fleming – backing vocals
Sandy Griffith – backing vocals
Ron Hemby – backing vocals
Skyler Jett – backing vocals
Conesha Owens – backing vocals
Guy Penrod – backing vocals
Claytoven Richardson – backing vocals
John Wesley Ryles – backing vocals
Audrey Sheeler – backing vocals
Judson Spence – backing vocals
Jeannie Tracy-Smith – backing vocals
Cindy Richardson Walker – backing vocals
Audrey Wheeler – backing vocals
Chris Willis – backing vocals
Dennis Wilson – backing vocals
Simon Bell – backing vocals
Lonnie Wilson – drums
Terry Lee McMillan – percussion
Glenn Worf – bass guitar
Brian Tankersley – bass guitar, keyboards, drum programming, synthesizer bass
Walter Afanasieff – programming
Gary Cirimelli – programming, backing vocals
George Cocchini – electric guitar
Dan Dugmore – steel guitar
Dann Huff – guitar, electric guitar, rhythm guitar, classical guitar
Jerry McPherson – electric guitar
Michael Thompson – rhythm guitar
Biff Watson – guitar, acoustic guitar
John Jarvis – piano, keyboards
Carl Marsh – keyboards
Steve Nathan – keyboards, Hammond organ
Kirk Whalum – soprano saxophone

Production
Tom Shapiro – producer, musical arranger
Brian Tankersley – associate producer, engineer, mixing
Jan Perry – assistant producer
Walter Afanasieff – arranger, co-producer ("Wherever Would I Be", Walter A. Mix)
Dana Jon Chappelle – sound engineer, mixing
Jay Healy – sound engineer
Greg Parker – assistant engineer
Bill O'Donovan – assistant engineer
Wayne Morgan – assistant engineer
Shawn McLean – assistant engineer
John Kliner – assistant engineer
Steve Ledet – assistant engineer
Mick Guzauski – mixing
David Gleeson – mixing assistant
Craig Silvey – mixing assistant
Mike Scott – mixing assistant
Hank Williams – mastering
John Geary – illustrations
Recorded at Javelina Recording Studios, The Bennett House, Recording Arts, Woodland Digital, Eleven Eleven Sound, GBT Studio (Nashville), and Schnee Studio (Hollywood): late January – early April 1994.

Charts

Bibliography
Howes, Paul (2001). The Complete Dusty Springfield; London: Reynolds & Hearn Ltd.

References

Dusty Springfield albums
1995 albums
Columbia Records albums